Gabriella Da Silva-Fick (born 23 August 2000) is an Australian tennis player.

Da Silva-Fick has a career-high singles ranking of world No. 460, achieved on 22 February 2021. She also has a best WTA doubles ranking of 413, reached on 14 October 2019.

Career

2016–20: ITF tournaments
Da Silva-Fick made her debut on the ITF Circuit in March 2016, scoring her first win in Kaltenkirchen in June 2017.

In January 2019, Da Silva-Fick lost in the first round of Australian Open qualifying.
In June 2019, she won her first ITF doubles title in Kaltenkirchen, Germany.

2021: WTA debut
In February 2021, Da Silva-Fick made her WTA Tour main-draw debut at the Phillip Island Trophy, where she played in both the singles and doubles main draws. She achieved her first WTA main-draw win, defeating 92nd ranked Aliaksandra Sasnovich as a lucky loser in the second round. Da Silva-Fick lost in the third round.

ITF Circuit finals

Doubles: 7 (3 titles, 4 runner-ups)

References

External links
 
 
 Gabriella Da Silva-Fick at Tennis Australia

2000 births
Living people
Australian female tennis players
Tennis players from Sydney
Australian people of Portuguese descent
South African emigrants to Australia